Peter Brooks (born 1955) is a Welsh Anglican priest: since 31 October 2022  he has been Archdeacon with responsibility for Ministry Areas in the Diocese of Swansea and Brecon.

After a career in the retail sector, he trained for ordination at St Michael's College, Llandaff. He was ordained deacon in 1999 and priest in 2000, beginning his career with a curacy at Morriston. He has held incumbencies at Rhayader, and Three Cliffs in the Gower Peninsula. The date of his collation has been announced as 17th December 2022 at 2pm in Brecon Cathedral.

References

1955 births
20th-century Welsh Anglican priests
21st-century Welsh Anglican priests
Living people
Alumni of St Michael's College, Llandaff
Church in Wales archdeacons